Merike is an Estonian feminine given name. The name is derived from the Estonian language  word meri, meaning "sea", and was first proposed as a given name by the Estonian linguist Julius Mägiste for inclusion on the recommended list of names of the Estonian Mother Tongue Society (Emakeele Seltsi) in 1929.

As of 1 January 2021, 3,192 women in Estonia have the first name Merike, making it the 37th most popular female name in the country. The name is most commonly found in Võru County, where 35.92 per 10,000 inhabitants of the county bear the name. Individuals bearing the name Merike include:

Merike Aarma (born 1950), choir director and music teacher 
Merike Martinson (born 1940), physician and politician
Merike Pau (1941–2008), translator
Merike Rõtova (born 1936), chess player
Merike Talve (1957–1997), curator, artist and writer

References

Feminine given names
Estonian feminine given names